Albert Vos (born 25 November 1886, date of death unknown) was a Belgian sailor. He and Victor Godts competed for Belgium at the 1936 Summer Olympics in the Star event.

References

External links
 
 

1886 births
Year of death missing
Belgian male sailors (sport)
Olympic sailors of Belgium
Sailors at the 1936 Summer Olympics – Star
Place of birth missing